Kusuma Karunaratne nee Ediriweera Jayasooriya (born November 21, 1940) is a Sri Lankan academic, university administrator, Professor and scholar of Sinhalese language and literature.

Personal life
Kusuma Jayasooriya was born on November 21, 1940 at Dickwella, Dodampahala to a business family of Mr. and Mrs. D. E. Jayasooriya. She had her school education at Dodampahala Vidyalaya and then at Vijitha Vidyalaya, Dickwella.
She completed her undergraduate education at the University of Ceylon in the Peradeniya campus; there in 1964, she became the first female student in her discipline to earn a First class honours degree from that institution. She later married Samarajeewa Karunaratne, an engineer by profession. They have two sons, Savant Karunaratne and Passant Karunaratne, both electrical engineers specializing in Graphics and Image/Video Processing. The elder, Savant Karunaratne, has a Ph.D. in Electrical and Computer Engineering from the University of Sydney, Australia. The younger, Passant Karunaratne, has a Ph.D. in Electrical Engineering and Computer Science from Northwestern University, in the United States.

Academic career
An academic career began with her appointment as an assistant lecturer of the Department of Sinhala at the University of Ceylon. In 1967, Mrs. Karunaratne and her husband traveled to the United Kingdom where both furthered their education with post-graduate studies, with her studying Sociology of Literature at the University of Essex. Later she pursued graduate studies at the School of Oriental and African Studies in London. She was awarded her doctorate from the University of Colombo.
 
Karunaratne became the first female lecturer in the Sinhala Department at the University of Columbo, and later went on to become the first female Professor of Sinhala and the first woman to head that Department. Professor Karunaratne would later go on to become the Dean and the Acting Vice-Chancellor of the University of Colombo.

During her career she has taught Sinhala to many Japanese, including professors and diplomats, thus helping to strengthen the relations between Japan and Sri Lanka. She has translated many English and Japanese novels to Sinhala.

Publications
A Glimpse of Japanese Culture 
Selected Sri Lankan Short Stories, Vol. I & Vol. II., co-authored (with Sarath Wijesooriya), published by Godage Publishing , 
English-Sinhalese translation of Hemingway's The Sun Also Rises

Honors and awards
 Ruhunu Putra Award
 Liya Waruna Award
 Fulbright, Fellow.
 Japan Foundation, Fellow.
 Order of the Rising Sun, Gold Rays and Neck Ribbon

References

External links
 Kusuma Karunaratne: The simple, traditional Sri Lankan lady
 Darling we aren't too old, though we pass the Jubilee Gold:Mathematician + intellectual = love, by Lakmal Welabada
 

1940 births
Living people
Sinhalese academics
Alumni of the University of Ceylon (Peradeniya)
Recipients of the Order of the Rising Sun, 3rd class
Academic staff of the University of Colombo
Alumni of SOAS University of London
Alumni of the University of Essex
Sri Lankan academic administrators
Sri Lankan women academics